Zoran Hajdić (born 24 September 1969) is a retired Serbian football defender.

References

1969 births
Living people
Serbian footballers
FK Vojvodina players
S.C. Salgueiros players
G.D. Peniche players
Association football defenders
Primeira Liga players
Serbian expatriate footballers
Expatriate footballers in Portugal
Serbian expatriate sportspeople in Portugal